My Beautiful Girl, Mari (lit. "The Story of Mari") is a 2002 South Korean animated film. It follows the story of a young boy during summer vacation and ascends into flights of surrealistic fantasy, which may or may not be dream sequences. The English-language dub was directed and produced by Carl Macek and licensed by A.D. Vision.

Plot
Kim Nam-woo struggles through life as people around him constantly leave him; his best friend, Jun-ho, is going to study in Seoul and in some ways his widowed mother is "leaving" him too by paying more attention to her new boyfriend. To escape, he goes to a dream world, where he meets a girl named Mari. The story follows Nam-woo in discovering himself and maturing.

Cast
 Nam-woo—Ryu Deok-hwan (Korean), Alejandro Fallick (English)
 Adult Nam-woo—Lee Byung-hun (Korean), Jay Hickman (English)
 Jun-ho—Sung In-gyu (Korean), Clint Bickham (English)
 Adult Jun-ho—Gong Hyung-jin (Korean), Chris Patton (English)
 Nam-woo's Mom—Bae Jong-ok (Korean), Christine Auten (English)
 Nam-woo's Grandma—Na Moon-hee (Korean), Shelley Calene-Black (English)
 Jun-ho's Father—Jang Hang-sun (Korean), John Swasey (English)
 Soog-Y—Lee Nari (Korean), Kira Vincent-Davis (English)
 Kyung-min—Ahn Sung-ki (Korean), Andy McAvin (English)

Awards
 Grand Prix Winner (Best Feature Film) at the 26th Annecy International Animated Film Festival (Annecy, France)

External links
 
 
 My Beautiful Girl, Mari: The blossoming of Korean animation—frames per second magazine

South Korean animated films
2002 fantasy films
ADV Films
Annecy Cristal for a Feature Film winners
2000s South Korean films